WVMW-FM (91.7 FM) is a radio station licensed to Scranton, Pennsylvania, United States, the station serves the Scranton area.  The station is currently owned by Marywood University.

References

External links

VMW-FM
VMW-FM
Radio stations established in 1983